Temple Beth El, also known as Temple Beth-El, is a Reform synagogue currently located in Bloomfield Township, Michigan, United States. Beth El was founded in 1850 in the city of Detroit, and is the oldest Jewish congregation in Michigan.

In 1982, its two former buildings in Detroit, at 3424 and 8801 Woodward Avenue, were listed on the National Register of Historic Places.

Early years
In 1850, Sarah and Isaac Cozens arrived in Detroit and moved into a house near the corner of Congress and St. Antoine streets.  At the time, there were only 60 Jews in Detroit (out of a population of over 21,000) and no synagogues.  Sarah urged her co-religionists to establish a congregation, and on September 22, 1850, twelve Jewish families came together at the Cozens's home to found the "Beth El Society" (a Michigan Historical Marker now commemorates this site).  The congregation engaged the services of Rabbi Samuel Marcus of New York.

Rabbi Marcus conducted services in the Orthodox mode, first in the Cozens's home and later in a room above a store on Jefferson Avenue.  In 1851, the congregation legally incorporated, and adopted its first constitution the following year. In 1854, Rabbi Marcus died of cholera, and the congregation chose Rabbi Leibman Adler, the father of famed Chicago School architect, Danker Adler, as his successor. Rabbi Leibman Adler fostered the temple's involvement the Underground Railroad. Fanny Butzel Heineman, Emil S. Heineman, and Mark Sloman were among the people who helped freedom seekers who crossed the Detroit River into Windsor, Ontario from 1854 to 1861.

In 1856, the congregation adopted a new set of by-laws including a number of innovations from the then-emerging Reform Judaism. Although the congregation was slowly growing, due in part to the influx of Jews to Detroit, some members of the congregation were unhappy with the reforms.  In 1860, the new by-laws were debated and re-affirmed.  However, the introduction of music into the worship service in 1861 caused a split, with 17 of the more Orthodox members of the congregation leaving to form Congregation Shaarey Zedek.  The remaining congregants adopted another set of by-laws in 1862, introducing greater reforms.

Temple Beth El was one of the thirty-four congregations involved in the founding of the Union of American Hebrew Congregations (now the Union for Reform Judaism) in 1873, and immediately became officially affiliated with the organization.  In 1889, Beth El hosted the Eleventh Council of the Union of American Hebrew Congregations, at which the Central Conference of American Rabbis was founded.

In 1861, the congregation moved into a new temple on Rivard Street. In 1867, it purchased a spacious building on Washington Boulevard and Clifford Street, where services were held until 1903.  A number of rabbis served at Beth El, none staying for long until the tenth rabbi, Louis Grossmann, arrived in 1884, immediately after his graduation from Hebrew Union College.  Grossmann was the first American-born rabbi of Beth El, and he organized a number of reforms, including the adoption of the Union Prayer Book.

Leo M. Franklin years
Rabbi Grossmann resigned in 1898, and the congregation hired Leo M. Franklin, a young Rabbi from Omaha and another Hebrew Union graduate.  The choice proved fortuitous, as Franklin served the congregation for over forty years. Franklin organized the United Jewish Charities (an umbrella organization to coordinate philanthropic activities), began the Woman's Auxiliary Association (later the Sisterhood of Temple Beth El), and assumed editorship of the Jewish American, Detroit's first English-Jewish weekly.  He also instituted an interdenominational community Thanksgiving service and established a student congregation (the forerunner of the Hillel Society) at the University of Michigan.

Under Franklin's leadership, Temple Beth El grew rapidly.  In 1902, the congregation authorized a new building on Woodward Avenue near Eliot Street.  The building  was designed by the young (and then relatively unknown) Beth El congregant Albert Kahn.  Beth El used this building until 1922 when it was sold for use as a theater and remodeled by architect C. Howard Crane.  It currently houses Wayne State University's Bonstelle Theatre.  In 1922, the congregation of over 800 families moved to another Albert Kahn structure at Woodward and Gladstone.  The building currently houses the Bethel Community Transformation Center.

Later years
Rabbi Franklin retired in 1941 and was replaced by B. Benedict Glazer.  After Glazer's untimely death in 1952, the congregation elected Richard C. Hertz as leader who served until 1982.

Once again, in 1973, the membership outgrew its facilities.  With the movement of many of the congregants to the northern suburbs, Beth El built a new temple in Bloomfield Township at Telegraph and 14 Mile Roads. The facility was designed by Minoru Yamasaki.

Present day
Temple Beth El currently has a membership of almost 1,100 families and is led by Senior Rabbi Mark Miller, Associate Rabbi Megan Brudney, and Cantor Rachel Gottlieb Kalmowitz. The Temple remains at the forefront of current trends in Jewish worship and program, innovative lifelong education, and a commitment to interfaith relations and active work in the broader community.

Architecture

Temple Beth El has been the congregation for two well-known architects. The first is Albert Kahn, who designed both the 1902 and 1922 temple buildings. Kahn's most well-known works include the Packard Automotive Plant, Highland Park Ford Plant, Ford Rouge Complex, the Fisher Building, Willow Run Plant, and the Clements Library, Hatcher Graduate Library, Hill Auditorium, and Burton Tower on the University Of Michigan Central Campus.  The second architect is Dankmar Adler, who was ten when his father Rabbi Leibman Adler became the rabbi for the congregation. Dankmar later moved to Chicago, and after his subsequent apprenticeship and military service, became half of the firm Adler & Sullivan. Adler's firm was one of the most successful and prosperous architecture firms, giving a young Frank Lloyd Wright an apprenticeship, after which he was eventually fired for moonlighting.  Adler designed the Old Chicago Tribune Building, The Jeweler's Building, the Auditorium Building, the Wainwright Building, Charnley House, Guaranty Building, and the Transportation Building for the 1893 Columbian Exposition.  

Another architectural connection is with Minoru Yamasaki, whose Birmingham, Michigan firm designed the 1973 temple building. The firm also designed the ill-fated Pruitt-Igoe complex in St. Louis, Missouri, and the World Trade Center in New York City.  According to the congregation, the World Trade Center towers and the Beth El temple were being designed at the same time, and the models for both were physically adjacent to each other while they were being refined and constructed. Yamasaki was said to have designed the current Temple Beth El in Bloomfield Hills to resemble a tent as early temporary Jewish Synagogues during the Jewish Exodus from Egypt were located in tents. The current Temple Beth El has many architectural features for which Yamasaki is known for; including poured concrete pillars, a natural skylight running the length of the building and large windows at ground level accommodating views of the surrounding natural landscape. Yamasaki has been credited for giving Latvian architect Gunnar Birkerts his start, which has resulted in numerous award-winning projects, many of which are around Ann Arbor, Michigan and Corning, New York.

See also

 History of the Jews in Metro Detroit

References

External links
Photographs from the Rabbi Leo M. Franklin archives: these include period photographs of the buildings used by Temple Beth El throughout its history.

Reform synagogues in Michigan
Jews and Judaism in Detroit
Buildings and structures in Oakland County, Michigan
Religious buildings and structures in Detroit
Synagogues on the National Register of Historic Places in Michigan
National Register of Historic Places in Detroit
National Register of Historic Places in Oakland County, Michigan
Religious organizations established in 1850
1850 establishments in Michigan
Synagogues completed in 1867
Synagogues completed in 1902
1902 establishments in Michigan
Beaux-Arts architecture in Michigan
Beaux-Arts synagogues
Synagogues completed in 1922
1922 establishments in Michigan
Neoclassical architecture in Michigan
Neoclassical synagogues
Synagogues completed in 1973
1974 establishments in Michigan
Modernist architecture in Michigan
Albert Kahn (architect) buildings